Ramsland is the surname of the following people

Katherine Ramsland (born in 1953), American author and professor
Martin Ramsland (born in 1993), Norwegian football player
Max Ramsland (1882-1918), Canadian politician in Saskatchewan
Ole Ramsland (1854-1930), American politician in Minnesota
Sarah Ramsland (1882-1964), Canadian politician in Saskatchewan